The Singing Bee is a Philippine karaoke game show premiered on April 21, 2008 on ABS-CBN. It is based on the American version of the same name. A combinination of karaoke singing and a spelling bee-style competition, this show features contestants trying to remember the lyrics to popular songs.

In each episode, six contestants will be selected from the audience to play a series of games that test their knowledge of song lyrics. Contestants making an error forfeit their chance to get into the "musical chairs". Contestants not in a musical chair position when the round is over are eliminated. The grand prize is P1,000,000.  It was presented by Amy Perez and Roderick Paulate for its sixth and seventh seasons; it was previously hosted by Cesar Montano for five seasons. The house band, Bandble Bee, is led by Mel Villena, with several house singers called The Songbees. Dancing to the band are the house dancers, The Honeybees.

History
The Singing Bee premiered on April 21, 2008 replacing Kung Fu Kids.

On the August 22 episode, the show was supposed to end their first season but it was announced that the show was given an extended run due to insistent public demand. The show's first-season finale was aired September 5, 2008, and was replaced by I Love Betty La Fea. But after the end of season one finale, it was revealed in a teaser wherein the bee singing "The Singing Bee" theme song which means The Singing Bee will be returning soon. Recently, another teaser pertaining to its return was aired. The second season was a 1-hour show that aired every weekend starting October 11, 2008.

On December 28, 2008, the show started the BeeKada Edition wherein 5 groups consisting of 3 members are the contestants (2 members per group at one time on September 12, 2009). The BeeDeoke Round was removed from the game format. The prizes were increased as well including the Jackpot prize on the Final Countdown which is now worth two million pesos P2,000,000 On April 18 and 19, 2009, The Singing Bee celebrated their 1st Year Anniversary and it also marked the end of season two. It followed the third season starting April 25, 2009.

On its season three, they replaced the segment Jumblebee round with a new segment called Pics Bee with You Round.

In September 2009, The Singing Bee season four finale was aired. It was announced on this episode that season five will start on October 3, 2009 with their new schedule every Saturday nights at 7:30pm to 8:30pm.

On its fifth season, they brought back the segment Jumblebee round to replace the Pics Bee with You Round based on viewers' requests.

After three years, The Singing Bee marked its comeback with the sixth season premiered on November 16, 2013. It aired Saturday afternoons at 3:30pm until February 22, 2014.  On February 24, 2014, the show moved to weekday mornings at 11:00am to 11:45am, replacing Minute to Win It. The new format changes include a Daily Champion from Monday to Thursday, with all four champions returning on Friday to compete for the P1,000,000 Final Countdown. On July 16, 2014, the show changed its timeslot to 10:45am due to Typhoon Glenda. The season six ended on August 29, 2014, as the show temporarily ceased off to give way for the 2014 FIBA Basketball World Cup.

During the start of season seven, the show returned on September 16, 2014 with their one-hour schedule every 10:30am to 11:30am. It featured a new segment round called 2 Beecome 1. On its first anniversary on November 14, 2014, hosts KD and Amay became players with Billy Crawford as the special guest host. The season seven ended on February 6, 2015, with the finale episode featuring returning champions Sheryl Cruz, Frenchie Dy and Bodie Cruz as players, and FlordeLiza star Jolina Magdangal as the 8-time defending champion. The show was put on hiatus and has so far never returned due to Roderick Paulate's decision to run for councilor of Quezon City and focus his time as a politician, whereas Amy Perez still hosts Umagang Kay Ganda.

Gameplay
At the start of the show, the band plays a song and the host "randomly" gives audience members a chance to sing part of the song. The players are selected through a draw conducted by a private auditing firm. Six contestants will be chosen to compete in various rounds until the day's winner and defending champion are left standing in The Final Countdown.

Segments

To Bee Continued
One of the hosts would provide the year the song was released, the performer, and the title of the song. A portion of the song is performed, and then the contestant has to attempt to sing the next line of the song. If correct, they will claim a seat and advance to the next round, and a new song is introduced, which the next contestant in line must attempt; if not, they have to step back, and the next person in line tries the same song. A song is thrown out if none of the remaining contestants get the line correct. The first three contestants who claim a seat advance to the next round.

BeeDeoke
The three remaining contestants try to sing a song in a fill-in-the-blank format and correctly answer 9 blanks (three blanks for each contestant). Each correct word is worth two points accumulated for the final round. After the To Bee Continued round, the contestant who accumulated the most points will get to play in the new round called 2 Beecome 1.

If the champion concede their title, the first 2 high-scorers will proceed to the 2 Beecome 1 round. But it still retain its mechanics.

The segment first appeared in October 2008 but was discontinued after the Beekada Edition started. In Season 6, the segment returned and merged with Singing With The Enemy.

2 Beecome 1
2 Beecome 1 was introduced in season 7. The remaining one player and the defending champion will have a face-off in this round. To determine who is going first, a toss-up is started. They are given clues about "anything and everything that is related to music." If a contestant give the correct singer or instrument, they will first. They're given five sets of songs, each set includes two song titles. This time, they will choose a song title. They are given the year, the singer and the song title they chose. If they are correct, they will have a point. Whoever has the most points wins and proceed to The Final Countdown.

If the champion gives up their title as defending champion, the two remaining contestants will have a face-off, following the same rules.

The Final Countdown
Mel Villena introduces this concluding round by announcing: "It's The Final Countdown!" (based on a song called "The Final Countdown" by hard rock band Europe).

The Champion will face a final/jackpot round to win the pot money. The hosts introduce 7 categories, each one has one song. They choose a category; they are given the year, the artist and the title from the category they chose. If they give the correct line, they have a point. If they have 3 points, they win the pot money (the pot money must begin at P200,000 if the winner the day before wins yesterday's pot money). If they are wrong, they is crossed out. If they have 2 crosses, the game is automatically over and they will win P20,000 from being a winner of 2 Beecome 1. If they did not win the pot money, the hosts will add ₱20,000 for the next day (e.g. If the pot money is ₱340,000, they will add ₱20,000 and the pot money for the next day is P360,000). It will increase and increase until they win the pot money. If the champion wins the pot money, it will begin again at ₱200,000 for the next day. From January 27, 2015 to February 6, 2015, when the season 7 ends, the pot money adds to P50,000 instead of ₱20,000 (e.g. If the pot money is ₱450,000, they will add ₱50,000 and the pot money for the next day is ₱500,000).

Previously, the winner of the main game faces off against the reigning champion. To determine who goes first, a toss-up is started. The host gives a name of an artist. The first player to buzz in first with the correct title of any of the said artist's songs will go first. They are given a song, the year, and the artist. Then, they will need to sing the correct lyrics just like the format in the To Bee Continued round. If they are  correct, they win ₱30,000. If not, the opposing player will need to sing the correct lyrics of the same song to win the cash. If any player sings the correct lyrics, they will have the right to start the next song. If neither gets the right lyric, a toss-up is played again to determine who will start the next song. Seven songs are played. Whoever gets the most money becomes champion, however, if a player can correctly guess the lyrics from four songs, they will automatically win the jackpot prize. In the event of a tie, the champion always wins. It was revised due to BeeKada Edition select 2 of the three members of the group.

Discontinued segments

JumbleBee
While the band is performing, words of a next line are shown scrambled on a screen. The contestant is required to sing the line in its correct order. Each correct line is worth two points that are accumulated for the final round.

During season one, four contestants were divided into two head-to-head duos and the winners of the duos go on to the Chorus Showdown Round. During season two, the four contestants solely completed for the next round's three spots.

To Bee Corrected
The host would provide the year the song was released, the performer, and the title of the song. A portion of the song is performed and wrong line is sung at the end, and then the contestant has to attempt to correct the wrong line of the song. If correct, they advance to the next round, and a new song is introduced, which the next contestant in line must attempt; if not, they have to step back, and the next person in line tries the same song. A song is thrown out if none of the remaining contestants get the line correct. The first four people who get a song line correct move on to the second round.

Pics Bee with You
Contestants are shown pictures as clues use pictogram to the line they are supposed to sing.

Singing with the Enemy
Only one song is sung during the whole round and all the contestants take turns in singing parts the song continuously. A correct lyric is equal to one point and the song continues to the next contestant. If a contestant is wrong they lose the chance to gain a point. The player with the fewest points in the end of the round is eliminated and the 2 remaining contestants move on to the Beedeoke round. However, on BeeKada Edition to eliminate 2 groups (1 group will eliminated if in case of vacancy of the defending champion) then proceed to the Final Countdown.

Showdown
This follows a similar format to the first round, but instead of singing a line, the contestant is required to sing the entire chorus without mistakes from the song performed. If both are correct or incorrect (sometimes after two rounds), then they go to a tiebreaker, where they are given the year and the name of the performer and the first person to buzz in will be given the option of playing that round or passing it to the other player. If the singer is correct, he/she win. Otherwise the other contestant wins.

The winner moves on to the "Final Countdown".

House singers
Since the show's inception, house singers provide the main vocals of the songs throughout the show. By the end of season two, the main house singers were referred to as the "Songbees". As of season six, none of the original Songbees remain. Five finalists from season one of The Voice of the Philippines are the current Songbees including Isabella Fabregas, Jessica Reynoso, Penelope Matanguihan, Maki Ricafort and Yuki Ito. As of January 4, 2014 episode, another The Voice of the Philippines finalist, Stan Perfecto, joined the sixth Songbees and on January 11, 2014 another one of The Voice of the Philippines finalist, Dan Billano joined the seventh Songbees.

Final
Jessica Reynoso (from The Voice of the Philippines; Team apl)
Penelope Matanguihan (from The Voice of the Philippines; Team apl)
Maki Ricafort (from The Voice of the Philippines; Team Sarah)
Stan Perfecto (from The Voice of the Philippines; Team apl)
Dan Billano (from The Voice of the Philippines; Team Bamboo)
Paolo Onesa (from The Voice of the Philippines; Team Bamboo)
Janice Javier (from The Voice of the Philippines; Team apl)

Past
Apple Chiu (from Philippine Idol)
Frenchie Dy (Champion of Star in a Million Season 2; Celebrity Player in Season 6 with KZ Tandingan)
Michael Cruz (from Star in a Million Season 2)
Led Sobrepeña III 
MC Castro (from SAIA Band formerly known as Metafour)
OJ Mariano (from Star in a Million Season 2)
Ivy Joy Maniquiz (from Born Diva )
Sheng Belmonte (from Pinoy Dream Academy Season 2) (Guest Singer)
Sheryl Kao 
Jason Torreda 
Ken Dingle (from Philippine Idol)
Thirdy Casas (from Search for a Million Season 2)
Arms Cruz (from Philippine Idol)
Hannah Pesy
Isabella Fabregas (The Voice of the Philippines; Team Bamboo)
Yuki Ito (The Voice of the Philippines; Team Sarah)

Guest singers

Season 1
Chad Peralta (from Pinoy Dream Academy)
Gary Valenciano
Pepe Smith
Rico J. Puno
Sheryn Regis
Rachel Alejandro
Aiza Seguerra
Andrew E.

Season 2
Sarah Geronimo (October 11, 2008)
Sam Milby (October 12, 2008)
Sheryn Regis (November 23, 2008)
Arnel Pineda (January 4, 2009)
Rachelle Ann Go (January 11, 2009)
Gary Valenciano (February 8, 2009)
Mark Bautista (February 22, 2009)
Guji Lorenzana and Janelle Jamer (February 28 & March 1, 2009)
Manilyn Reynes, Rachel Alejandro, and Aiza Seguerra (April 19, 2009)

Season 3–4
Sheryn Regis (May 2, 2009)
Sheryn Regis and Jed Madela (May 3, 2009)
Nikki Gil (May 16 and 17, 2009)
Zsa Zsa Padilla (June 27, 2009)
Billy Crawford (June 28, 2009)
Erik Santos (July 26, 2009)
APO Hiking Society (September 19, 2009)
Christian Bautista (September 26, 2009)

Season 5
Rachelle Ann Go and Jed Madela (October 3, 2009 & October 10, 2009)

Special episodes
Some episodes of the show have been considered as "Special Episodes" having different themes and contestants based on the category given.
Filipino Songs
Jukebox
Movie Themes (July 21, 2008)
Little Big Star and Little Big Superstar contestants (July 24, 2008) — Rhap Salazar as Defending Champion
Radio Disc Jockeys (July 25, 2008) — Rnold Rey as Challenger
Pageant Queens (July 26, 2008)
Special Week-Long Birthday Celebration of Buboy (July 28 - August 1, 2008)
Comedians (July 29, 2008)
Pinoy Rock (August 1, 2008)
Retro (August 4, 2008)
Girl Power
Boys Will Be Boys
Duets (August 20, 2008)
The Singing Bayan (August 25, 2008)
Welcome to the Jungle (August 29, 2008)
Bee Can Dance (September 1, 2008)
Hapunan (September 2, 2008)
Novelty (September 3, 2008)
Name Game (September 4, 2008)
Pinoy Dream Academy (season 2) Top 6 Scholars (September 5, 2008) — Liezel Garcia as Challenger
It's The BEE World After All (October 26, 2008)
Bee Afraid, Bee Very Afraid (November 1, 2008)
Makulay ang Beehive (November 22, 2008)
Araw, Bee-tuin, Buwan (November 29, 2008)
A Bee-ry Merry Christmas (December 21, 2008)
'Di lang pang-Artista, pang-BEErit pa (December 28, 2008)
BEE to the 80's (January 24, 2009)
 (April 12, 2009)
BEES Like It Hot (April 18, 2009)
Happy 1st Anni-BEE (April 19, 2009) — First Anniversary episode
Green BEES Movement (May 2, 2009)
Ha-BEE Mother's Day (May 10, 2009)
Malayang BEE Yan (June 13, 2009) — Philippine Independence Day episode
Bee to School (June 14, 2009)
Haligi ng Kantahan (June 21, 2009)
Kasal, Kasali, Kantahan (June 27, 2009)
Just BEE it (July 4, 2009) — Michael Jackson Tribute episode
Happy Birthday, Buboy! (August 1 & 2, 2009)
We'll Bee Missing You! (August 15, 2009) - Cory Aquino Tribute episode
BEE-bong Boy Band (August 29, 2009)
Crazy for BEE (August 30, 2009) - Madonna Episode
BEELIB sa New Wave (September 5, 2009)
TWO BEECOME ONE (September 12, 2009)
BEEyaheng Langit (September 20, 2009)
Royal BEE (September 26, 2009)
GaBEE ng Lagim (October 31, 2009) — Halloween episode
BEE Wish You a Merry Christmas (December 19, 2009) — Christmas episode
Let's BEEgin 2010 (January 2, 2010) - New Year episode
Bagong Taon, Bagong Beehive (January 9, 2010) — Post-New Year episode
Beauty and the BEES (January 16, 2010)
BeeFF (January 23, 2010)
Boses ng Pinoy (January 30, 2010)
'Til We Bee Again (February 6, 2010)
Maligayang Pasko! (December 21, 2013)
Kung Hei Fat Choy (February 1, 2014)
A BEElion Thanks (February 6, 2015) — Frenchie Dy as Challenger

List of winners
Aiza Seguerra, on July 8, 2008, became a champion of The Singing Bee twice, but after her second win of the PHP1,000,000 jackpot, she gave up her throne to give chance for others. The same thing happened to Rachel Alejandro, where she gave up her throne as defending champion. She defeated her co-contestant singer Bituin Escalante."

Marlo Mortel on September 26, 2014, became a champion of The Singing Bee six times, but due to prior commitments such as the filming of Be Careful with My Heart (that he has to finish for the finale starting Oct-Nov 2014), and for the upcoming show called Oh My G!, Mortel, suddenly withdraws on October 3, 2014, he also mentioned on Instagram.

Reception
The Singing Bee is consistently topping TV ratings on its timeslot. In the year ender NUTAM TV ratings results of AGB Nielsen Philippines last 2008, it ranked 6th in the Top Weekday Primetime Programs with 33.2%, and 5th in the Top Weekend Primetime Programs with 26.4%. In Kantar Media Philippines, it hit an all-time high rating of 32.7% on July 26, 2009.

See also
List of programs broadcast by ABS-CBN
List of programs aired by ABS-CBN

References

External links
Official website

ABS-CBN original programming
Philippine game shows
Musical game shows
Karaoke television series
2008 Philippine television series debuts
2015 Philippine television series endings
Philippine television series based on American television series
Filipino-language television shows